Edith Hallor (March 26, 1896 – May 21, 1971) was an American stage and film actress. She starred in a number of films during the silent era. She later appeared in a handful of minor, uncredited roles during the sound era.

Hallor appeared in the original Broadway cast of the musical Leave It to Jane (1917). Her other Broadway credits included The Peasant Girl (1915), Dance and Grow Thin (1917), Ziegfeld Follies of 1917, and Broadway Brevities of 1920.

Her sister Ethel Hallor and brother Ray Hallor were also actors.

Hallor was married to L. Lawrence Weber, and they had a son, Lawrence Weber Jr. They were divorced on June 18, 1920, on grounds that she had been unfaithful with Jack Dillon. She also married film director John Francis Dillon.

Selected filmography
Black Friday (1916 film) (1916)
A Man and the Woman (1917)
 Wrath (1917)
 Children of Destiny (1920)
 The Blue Pearl (1920)
 The Inside of the Cup (1921)
 Just Outside the Door (1921)
 Human Hearts (1922)
 Maid of Salem (1937)
 Just Off Broadway (1942)
 Having Wonderful Crime (1945)
 A Tree Grows in Brooklyn (1945)

Bibliography
 Goble, Alan. The Complete Index to Literary Sources in Film. Walter de Gruyter, 1999.
 Wlaschin, Ken. Silent Mystery and Detective Movies: A Comprehensive Filmography. McFarland, 2009.

References

External links
 
 
 

1896 births
1971 deaths
American film actresses
American stage actresses
People from Washington, D.C.
20th-century American actresses
20th-century American people